The year 1909 in radio contained a number of significant events.

Events
 18 March – Einar Dessau uses a shortwave radio transmitter in Denmark.
 Charles Herrold begins experimental voice transmissions in San Jose. KCBS (AM) (formerly KQW) has considered these transmissions to be the beginning of its broadcast history.

Births
 6 February – René Cutforth, English broadcaster (died 1984)
 3 March – Al Read, English radio comedian and sausage manufacturer (died 1987)
 24 March – Tommy Trinder, English radio, stage and screen comedian (died 1989)
 6 May – Loyd Sigmon, American amateur radio broadcaster (died 2004)
 1 December – Frank Gillard, English radio reporter and executive (died 1998)
 23 December – Maurice Denham, English character actor (died 2002)

References

 
Radio by year